The electoral division of Buckingham was an electoral division in the Tasmanian Legislative Council of Australia. It was abolished in 1999 after the Legislative Council was reduced from 19 members to 15. The then sitting member, David Crean, was allocated as the member for Elwick.

Members

See also
Buckingham Land District
Tasmanian Legislative Council electoral divisions

External links
Parliament Tasmania - Past election results for Buckingham

Former electoral districts of Tasmania
Southern Tasmania
1999 disestablishments in Australia